North-Eastern Space Applications Centre is a regional space centre established in September, 2000 by joint initiative of Department of Space, Government of India and North Eastern Council to expedite the usage of remote sensing technology to discover natural minerals uncovered in the North-Eastern states of India and to promote overall growth of North Eastern states of India using space science and technology.

History
North-Eastern Space Applications Centre was set up with a joint initiative of Department of Space and North Eastern Council in September, 2000 at Shillong in Meghalaya, India. The centre has been declared a protected area by the state government.

Objectives
The objective of NESAC is to search and utilize the natural resources present in the region using remote sensing, provide the North-Eastern states access to satellite services, and promote research in the space technology in the region by tying up with the academic institutions in the region.

Programmes
The centre presently focuses on Remote sensing and Geographic information systems, a satellite communication programme and space science research programmes

Facilities
The centre is equipped with modern GIS software like Erdas, Geomatica, eCognition, ESRI ArcGIS, and the like.
Its equipment includes:
Digital Photogrammetry Work Stations
A0 size Colour Scanner
High Quality printers and plotters
Leica Differential Global Positioning System (DGPS)
Visual Interpretation facilities
Spectroradiometer
UV-Visible Spectro-photometer, Flame Photometer
Echo-Sounder
Plant Canopy Imager

Projects
It has undertaken projects on the land mapping of North-Eastern States on 1:50,000 scale, and wasteland and wetland monitoring. It developed the FLEWS or Flood Early Warning System for the areas which are likely to be the worst affected by floods. It also developed touch input-based information kiosks to provide information about the state of Meghalaya.

Finances
The funding for the centre is divided in 50:50 ratio between Government of India and North-Eastern council. The centre has been allocated a budget of Rs. 8 crore for the financial year 2012–13 by the central government.

References

External links
 nesac.gov.in

Space programme of India
Science and technology in Meghalaya
Indian Space Research Organisation facilities
Buildings and structures in Meghalaya
2000 establishments in Meghalaya
Research institutes established in 2000